Dakin (1568 - 1585/6) was a ruler of the Kingdom of Sennar. He was the son of the previous ruler Nayil.

References 

Rulers of Sennar
16th-century monarchs in Africa